Sydney Henning Belfrage (21 July 1871 - 31 May 1950) M.D., M.R.C.S., L.R.C.P., was a British physician and writer.  He established a sizable general practice, served as the Divorce Registry's medical inspector, and was regarded as an authority on the law of nullity.

Life

Belfrage was born on 21 July 1871 in Lambeth. He was educated at Merchant Taylors' School, University College Hospital and St Thomas' Hospital. He obtained his M.D. in 1900.

Belfrage married Frances Grace Powley on 7 September 1899 at Purley, London. He was a member of the Royal Colleges of Surgeons, a leading member of the New Health Society and physician to Virginia Woolf. He authored the book What's Best to Eat? which was dedicated to Sir William Arbuthnot Lane.

Selected publications

What's Best to Eat (with a foreword by Elmer McCollum, 1926)
The A.B.C. of Food (1929)
Facts About Food (1938)
Illness (1938)

References

1871 births
1950 deaths
20th-century British medical doctors
British food writers
Diet food advocates
People educated at Merchant Taylors' School, Northwood